St. Martini Lutheran School in Milwaukee, Wisconsin, is a Lutheran school which is part of the  Lutheran Church–Missouri Synod. Based in Milwaukee's South Side, the school has a large Hispanic community with 90% of the students being of Hispanic descent. The school offers kindergarten through 8th grade. This school is nationally recognized for its inner city work and prides itself on the long-standing effect it has had on the lives of its students, their families and the wider community. The school's name comes from Martin Luther. This school focuses on reading strategies, which will help in the future professions of its students.

External links
Church website about the school
School website

Education in Milwaukee
Lutheran schools in Wisconsin
Private middle schools in Wisconsin
Private elementary schools in Wisconsin
Schools affiliated with the Lutheran Church–Missouri Synod